Fried eggplant, or fried aubergine, is featured in dishes of many different cuisines.

Regional varieties

Spain 
In Spanish cuisine, this dish takes the form of a tapa. In the province of Córdoba it is usually made with honey.

Turkey 
Fried eggplant ( or ) is found in Turkish cuisine. It is such a common dish during summer months that this season used to be called  (fried eggplant months) in Ottoman Istanbul, where this generalized frying caused huge fires and destroyed entire mahalles due to the abundance of old wooden houses. The dish is usually eaten with a garlic yogurt or tomato sauce.

Italy 
In Southern Italy, especially in Campania region, eggplants are cut into little pieces and therefore fried. Melanzane a funghetto have two variants, the one with tomatoes and the other without. Another recipe which contains fried eggplants is parmigiana di melanzane, famous in all southern regions of the country.

Middle East 
In Arab and Israeli cuisines, fried eggplant is typically served with tahini. In Israel, it is used to make sabich, a popular sandwich of fried eggplant and hard-boiled egg in a pita.

South Asia 

In India, fried eggplant is also known as brinjal phodi or vangyache kaap in the Konkani language. Made with shallow-fried eggplant slices, this recipe is typically a Konkani and Maharashtrian dish, very similar to begun bhaja  from Bengali cuisine.

See also
 List of eggplant dishes

References

Arab cuisine
Eggplant dishes
Mediterranean cuisine
Middle Eastern cuisine
Turkish cuisine
Vegetarian cuisine
Fried foods